Kaweh Mansoori (born 12 August 1988) is a German lawyer and politician of the Social Democratic Party (SPD) who has been serving as a member of the Bundestag since 2021.

Early life and education
Mansoori was born 1988 in the West German city of Gießen. He studied law at University of Giessen.

Political career
Mansoori became member of the Bundestag in the 2021 federal elections, representing the Frankfurt am Main II district. In the negotiations to form a coalition government between the SPD, the Green Party and Free Democratic Party (FDP) following the elections, he was part of his party's delegation in the working group on equality, co-chaired by Petra Köpping, Ricarda Lang and Herbert Mertin.

In parliament, Mansoori has since been serving on the Committee on Labour and Social Affairs and the Committee on Legal Affairs.

Within his parliamentary group, Mansoori belongs to the Parliamentary Left, a left-wing movement.

Other activities
 Education and Science Workers' Union (GEW), Member
 German United Services Trade Union (ver.di), Member

References 

Living people
1988 births
People from Giessen
Social Democratic Party of Germany politicians
21st-century German politicians
Members of the Bundestag 2021–2025